Events in the year 2021 in Bolivia.

Incumbents

National government 
 President: Luis Arce (MAS-IPSP)
 Vice President: David Choquehuanca (MAS-IPSP)
 President of the Chamber of Senators: Andrónico Rodríguez (MAS-IPSP)
 President of the Chamber of Deputies: Freddy Mamani Laura (MAS-IPSP)
 Assembly: 3rd

Events
Ongoing — COVID-19 pandemic in Bolivia
28 January – María Teresa Mercado, Mexican ambassador who was declared persona non grata during the 2019–2020 Mexico–Bolivia diplomatic crisis, is reappointed ambassador at the request of the government of President Luis Arce.
31 January – The doctors′ union pushes for  new lockdown as hospitals approach saturation. An average of one health worker dies every day. The total number of COVID-19 cases approaches 210,000 as the first 20,000 doses of Sputnik V COVID-19 vaccine arrive.
7 February – Environmental authorities investigate the deaths of 35 Andean condors, which is an endangered species.
18 February – Health workers announce a general strike from 18 to 28 February against the Ley de Emergencia Sanitaria (Emergency Health Law).
2 March – Twenty people are killed and 25 others injured in a bus accident in Colomi, Cochabamba Department.
3 March – Six people are killed when a railing collapses and they fall four floors  during a student protest at the Universidad Pública de El Alto (UPEA). Three of the organizers of the event are arrested and charged with homicide, and eight others are sought by the police.
7 March – Regional elections are held in all nine Departments of Bolivia for governors, mayors, councillors, and departmental assemblies. 
12 March – The government orders the arrest of former president Jeanine Áñez (2019–2020) and members of her government for terrorism, sedition, and conspiracy.
April (date unknown) – Members of Evo Morales′s personal bodyguard attended a rally in Plaza San Francisco dressed in uniforms belonging to the army of former Venezuelan president Hugo Chávez.
12 June – COVID-19: Marcel Ebrad Mexican Foreign Minister, announced on May 12 that Mexico will donate 400,000 doses of Oxford–AstraZeneca COVID-19 vaccine to Belize, Bolivia, and Paraguay.
19 November – Edgar Pary is appointed Minister for Education.

Deaths

=== January ===
12 January – Osvaldo Peredo, revolutionary leader (b. 1941)
19 January – Felipe "El Mallku" Quispe, Quechua leader and politician (b. 1942)
28 January – Gil Imaná, muralist and painter (b. 1933)

May 
30 May – Luisa Molina, folk singer (b. 1955)

June 
7 June – Jaime Junaro, singer (b. 1949)

August 
4 August – Moisés Torres, journalist, professor and politician, deputy (1997–2002) (COVID-19; b. 1949)

September 
24 September – Pablo Ramos, economist (b. 1937)

December 
26 December – Agustín Saavedra Weise, diplomat and writer, president of the Central Bank and Foreign Minister of Bolivia (1982) (b. 1943)

See also

Organization of American States
Amazon Cooperation Treaty Organization
Bolivarian Alliance for the Peoples of Our America

References

 
2020s in Bolivia
Years of the 21st century in Bolivia
Bolivia
Bolivia